Surtningssue or Surtningssui is a mountain on the border of Vågå Municipality and Lom Municipality in Innlandet county, Norway. It is located in the Jotunheimen mountains within Jotunheimen National Park. The mountain is surrounded by several other notable mountains including Veotinden, Styggehøbretindan, and Blåbreahøe to the north; Surtningssuoksle to the northeast; Besshø and Gloptinden to the southeast; Reinstinden, Raudhamran, and Hinnotefjellet to the southwest; Store Hellstugutinden, Nestsøre Hellstugutinden, and Søre Hellstugutinden to the west; and Austre Memurutinden and Store Memurutinden to the northwest.

Surtningssue has several distinct peaks, of which Store Surtningssue is the highest. The river Muru runs through the valley on the southwestern side of the mountain. Surtningssue is most easily reached from the cabin Memurubu, along the northern shore of the lake Gjendin.

Name
The first element is the genitive of a word *surtning which means 'the black one'. The last element is the finite form of su which means 'sow' - thus 'the black sow'. (It is common in Norway to compare the shape of mountains with animals.)

See also
List of mountains of Norway by height

References

Jotunheimen
Vågå
Lom, Norway
Mountains of Innlandet